The Houston Ladies Classic Stakes is a Grade III American thoroughbred horse race for fillies and mares age four and older over a distance of one and aon-sixteenth miles on the dirt track held annually in late January at Sam Houston Race Park in Houston, Texas. The event currently carries a purse of $400,000.

History

The inaugural running of the event was on 26 January 2013 and was won by Fox Hill Farms' 3/2 favorite Canadian-bred Joyful Victory who was ridden by Rosie Napravnik and trained by J. Larry Jones by  lengths in a time of 1:42.30 setting a new track record for the  miles distance breaking the former record set by Desert Air on 13 February 1999 of 1:42.79. The inaugural event was the richest Thoroughbred event on the program and in Texas which featured four stakes races worth $725,000. Later in the year Joyful Victory was retired by her owners and was sold in the November in the Fasig-Tipton select sale for US$2 million to Aaron & Marie Jones.

With the quality mares that were entering the event it was not long before the American Graded Stakes Committee gave the race a graded status of Grade III for the fourth running in 2016. The 2016 winner 
Forever Unbridled later in year won two Grade I events and ran third in the Breeders' Cup Distaff at Santa Anita Park as a 15/1 longshot to Beholder. The following year Forever Unbridled was undefeated and did win the Breeders' Cup Distaff.

After finishing third in the 2018 Breeders' Cup Distaff at Churchill Downs, Midnight Bisou began her 2019 four-year-old career in the Houston Ladies Classic. Starting as the 2/5 odds-on favorite, Midnight Bisou closed fast in late stretch to be win in the final strides. Midnight Bisou would win six more graded events and finish second in the Breeders' Cup Distaff at Santa Anita Park. Her performance during the year was enough to earn her US Champion Older Dirt Female Horse honors.

The event is one of only two graded stakes races held at the track along with the Grade III John B. Connally Turf Cup. Along with the Pulse Power Turf Sprint and Bob Bork Texas Turf Mile, the Houston Ladies Classic Stakes is one of the main events of the Houston Racing Festival.

Records

Speed record:
 miles:  1:42.30 – Joyful Victory (2013) (New Track Record)

Margins:
 lengths  – Joyful Victory (2013)  

Most wins:
 No horse has won the event more than once

Most wins by a jockey:
 2 – Joel Rosario (2016, 2022)

Most wins by a trainer:
 3 – Steven M. Asmussen (2019, 2020, 2022)

Most wins by an owner:
 2 – Fox Hill Farm (2013, 2015)

Winners

See also
 List of American and Canadian Graded races

External links
2022 Sam Houston Stakes Schedule

References

Mile category horse races for fillies and mares
Grade 3 stakes races in the United States
Horse races in Texas
Sam Houston Race Park
Graded stakes races in the United States
2013 establishments in Texas
Recurring sporting events established in 2013